Qotur (also Romanized as Qaţūr and Qoţūr; also known as Ghatoor, Kotur, Kutur, and Qutur) is a city in, and the capital of, Qatur District of Khoy County, West Azerbaijan province, Iran. Following the Treaty of Berlin in 1878, Qatur was handed over from the Ottoman empire to Iran. At the 2006 census, its population was 3,962 in 652 households, when it was a village. The following census in 2011 counted 4,663 people in 1,000 households, by which time the village had been elevated to the status of a city. The latest census in 2016 showed a population of 5,147 people in 1,193 households. It is adjacent to the Iran–Turkey border and is populated by Kurds of the Shakak tribe.

Climate 

Due to its elevation at 1,961m (6,433ft) above sea level, Qatur has a cold and temperate continental mediterranean climate (Köppen: Dsb). Winters are cold and wet while summers are warm and far dryer. The average annual temperature in Qotur is 6.9°C (44.4°F). Precipitation here is about 414mm (16.3in) per year.

References 

Khoy County

Populated places in West Azerbaijan Province

Populated places in Khoy County

Cities in West Azerbaijan Province

Kurdish settlements in West Azerbaijan Province